Azakhel Payan is a village of Nowshera Tehsil in northeastern Pakistan. The village houses an Afghan refugee camp.

The majority of the village population works in agriculture. Villagers mainly farm potatoes, sugar cane, wheat, corn, tomatoes, and cucumbers.

Etymology

The word Azakhel Payan is a linguistic compound consisting of three words. Aza is probably the name of its founder. The word khel might be derived from the Avestan word , meaning "uncountable" or "over-populated". Khel is a cognate of the Persian word , meaning "lots" or "too much".

By convention, the word khel is placed after the name of a common ancestor or leader when naming a village. Khel is usually part of a single village's name, but it may also be used for a larger settlement. The last part of the village's name, Payan, means "lower" in Persian or Urdu.

According to one theory, the name Aza Khel was given to the village by its founder. The founder may have been Raza Khan. Raza Khan, also spelled Aza Khan, is considered a legendary Afghan warrior. Raza Khan had seven brothers, one of whom was Zarif Khan. One mohalla (subdivision) of the village, Zarifkhel, may take its name from Zarif Khan.

Azakhel Payan might not take its name from a founder or legendary hero. Instead, the name Aza Khel may derive from Za Khel, a town in Kondoz, Afghanistan.

Geography
Azakhel Payan is bordered by the Cherat Mountains to the south and the Kabil River to the north. The village of Azakhel Bala lies just west of Azakhel Payan, and the town of Pir Piai is just east.

The area between the Kabil River and the Grand Trunk Road is called "Bela." It served as a training camp for Afghan mujaheddin during the Soviet-Afghan war. This area was  established as a refugee camp for the Afghan immigrants in during the reign of Muhammad Zia-ul-Haq.

The parent material in and surrounding Azakhel Payan is siltstone.

Azakhel Park
The Nowshera District government has leased 83 acres of agricultural land in Azakhel Payan to the University of Peshawar's Centre of Plant Biodiversity (CPB). This area is called Azakhel Park. The University of Peshawar plans to develop research laboratories, botanical nurseries, greenhouses, an herbarium, a museum, a conference hall, lecture theaters, a library, and areas for teaching students in Azakhel Park.

References

Populated places in Nowshera District